Greece became an IIHF member in 1987 and participated in five IIHF tournaments from 1991 to 1999.

History 
Greek hockey teams were found by Ahepa in the USA at the beginning of the 20th century, in Greece itself the sport started in the 1980s with players from abroad. Since 1999 there is no more any rink in olympic size due to lack of funds. 

The 2007-08 season saw the return of hockey when a small, temporary rink was built in Athens. The following season saw an ice rink built into a disused wrestling arena built for the 2004 Summer Olympics but when the financial crisis hit the rink was closed down. Ice sports are now limited to smaller rinks. There are two rinks in Athens and another in Thessaloniki. Often teams have to play early morning or late at night due to the fact that the rinks are mostly used for public skating.

The Greek Ice Hockey Championship is the only level of ice hockey in Greece. It is operated under the jurisdiction of the Greek Ice Sport Federation, a member of the IIHF.

References

 
Sport in Greece